The Winning Edge may refer to:

Books
The Winning Edge, 1973 book by Don Shula with Lou Sahadi 
The Winning Edge, 2001 cricketing book by Jack Potter

Film and TV
"The Winning Edge", a 1999 episode of Batman Beyond
"The Winning Edge", 1987 segment of Four Corners that examined drugs in sport in Australia
"The Winning Edge", a 1990 episode of Adventures in Odyssey